Kaarlo Kyösti Soinio (28 January 1888 – 24 October 1960) was a Finnish sportsperson, who won an Olympic bronze, and a sport leader and a sportsreporter.

Sport 

He was a pioneer in developing football, sportsreporting and municipal sport administration in Finland in the early 20th century. He also won an Olympic bronze in gymnastics.

Olympics

Footballer 

He won the Finnish championship in 1911 and 1912 playing for Helsingin Jalkapalloklubi.

Other 

He was an international referee in one football and one bandy match.

He sat in the board of the Football Association of Finland in various positions in 1910–1934. In their centennial history, Soinio is named the board's most distinguished member. He is the association's honorary member.

He also flourished in javelin throwing and rowing.

He was the editor-in-chief of Suomen Urheilulehti in 1913–1917, and a sportsreporter in Helsingin Sanomat in 1918–1957.

Career 

He graduated as a gymnastics teacher from the University of Helsinki in 1912, and worked in that profession in various schools.

He was the assistant police chief of Helsinki in 1924–1932. At the time he remained friends with footballer and smuggler Algoth Niska. He was forced to resign due to right-wing political pressure.

He was the secretary of the Helsinki municipal sports board in 1919–1944. He was the head of the Helsinki folkpark department in 1932–1945. He was the head of the Helsinki sporting office in 1945–1955. He was in the venue committee of the Helsinki Summer Olympics. He was the manager of the Helsinki ice stadium in 1955–1960.

Family 

His parents were butcher Gustaf Aleksander Salin and Fredrika Ahlfors.

He finnicized his name from Karl Gustaf Salin to Kaarlo Kyösti Soinio in 1906.

Footballer Eino Soinio was his brother.

He dated a woman for 27 years until they broke up amicably.

Sources

References

1888 births
1960 deaths
Finnish male artistic gymnasts
Finnish footballers
Gymnasts at the 1908 Summer Olympics
Footballers at the 1912 Summer Olympics
Olympic gymnasts of Finland
Olympic footballers of Finland
Olympic bronze medalists for Finland
Olympic medalists in gymnastics
Medalists at the 1908 Summer Olympics
Association football midfielders
Finland international footballers
20th-century Finnish people